Glyptochiton is an extinct  of polyplacophoran mollusc. Glyptochiton became extinct during the Carboniferous period.

References 

Prehistoric chiton genera